Keskin is a town and district of Kırıkkale Province in the Central Anatolia region of Turkey. At the 2000 Turkish census, the population of the district was 59,150, of whom 34,827 lived in the town of Keskin.

History
From 1867 until 1922, Keskin was part of Angora Vilayet.

See also
Once Upon a Time in Anatolia

Notes

References

External links 
 District governor's official website 

Populated places in Kırıkkale Province
Districts of Kırıkkale Province